Cyberman is a series of Big Finish Productions audio drama based on the long-running British science fiction television series Doctor Who. Eight audio plays were produced in 2 series of 4 CDs. The series takes place during a fictional time in the Doctor Who universe known as the Orion Wars. During the Orion Wars, humanity is at war with androids who no longer wish to be under human control. The center of the action is Project Scorpius, a "military project gone dark, off the books."

The series is produced by Nicholas Briggs and Big Finish Managing Director Jason Haigh-Ellery.

Cast

Series 1 (2005)
 Samantha – Hannah Smith
 Paul Hunt / Comms / Security  – Barnaby Edwards
 Hendry/Helliton/Glaust/Karen's Father/Protester/Guard  – Ian Brooker
 Duncan Levinson / Captain / Pilot / Public Address / Soldier – Toby Longworth
 SSC Control/Operations Officer/Helm – Samantha Sanns
 Comp – Samantha Sanns
 Admiral Karen Brett – Sarah Mowat
 Captain Liam Barnaby / Nash – Mark McDonnell
 Computer – Hannah Smith
 Cyberman/CyberPlanner/Control/Guard/Reporter – Nicholas Briggs

Series 2 (2009)
 Liam Barnaby – Mark McDonnell
 Samantha Thorn – Hannah Smith
 Paul Hunt – Barnaby Edwards
 Hazel Trahn – Jo Castleton
 Yan – Ian Brooker
 Chessman – Ian Brooker
 Milo Taggart – Andrew Dickens
 Louis Richter – Toby Hadoke
 Merced – Martin Trent
 Becca Trahn – Cal Jaggers
 Janice Webb – Jess Robinson
 The News – Stuart Crossman
 Cybermen/CyberPlanner – Nicholas Briggs

Episodes

Series 1 (2005)

Series 2 (2009)

References

External links 
 Cyberman at the Big Finish Website

Audio plays based on Doctor Who
Big Finish Productions
Doctor Who spin-offs
Cyberman audio plays